The groove-billed ani (Crotophaga sulcirostris) is a tropical bird in the cuckoo family with a long tail and a large, curved beak. It is a resident species throughout most of its range, from southern Texas, central Mexico and The Bahamas, through Central America, to northern Colombia and Venezuela, and coastal Ecuador and Peru. It only retreats from the northern limits of its range in Texas and northern Mexico during winter.

Taxonomy
The groove-billed ani was formally described by the English naturalist William John Swainson from a specimen collected in Temascaltepec, Mexico. It still bears its original binomial name of Crotophaga sulcirostris. The specific epithet combines the Latin  meaning "furrow" with - meaning "-billed". The species is monotypic: no subspecies are recognised.

Description
Wingspan ranges 41-46 cm (16-18 in). It is completely black, with a very long tail almost as long as its body. It has a huge bill with lengthwise grooves running the length of the upper mandible. It is very similar to the smooth-billed ani, some specimens of which have bills as small as the groove-billed and with grooves on the basal half. The two species are best distinguished by voice and range. In flight, the ani alternates between quick, choppy flaps and short glides.

Habitat and diet
Like other anis, the groove-billed is found in open and partly open country, such as pastures, savanna, and orchards. It feeds largely on a mixed diet of insects, seeds, and fruits.

Breeding
The groove-billed ani lives in small groups of one to five breeding pairs. They defend a single territory and lay their eggs in one communal nest. All group members incubate the eggs and care for the young.

Protected status
The groove-billed ani is protected under the Migratory Bird Treaty Act of 1918.

References

External links 

 
 
 Groove-billed Ani Images by Monte M. Taylor
 Groove-billed Ani Picture at www.avesphoto.com
 

groove-billed ani
Birds of the Rio Grande valleys
Birds of the Caribbean
Birds of Central America
Birds of Colombia
Birds of Venezuela
Birds of Ecuador
Birds of Peru
Birds of the Netherlands Antilles
groove-billed ani